Salim Uddin is a Bangladeshi politician and the incumbent Member of Parliament from Sylhet-5.

Early life
Uddin was born on 6 April 1960. He completed his undergrad at the University of Greenwich.

Career
Uddin was elected to Parliament from Sylhet-5 as a candidate of Jatiya Party in 2014. In 2017, there was a viral video of him arguing with a traffic officer after his car tried to enter the wrong way.

References

Living people
10th Jatiya Sangsad members
1960 births
Jatiya Party politicians